Karthikapuram is a small town in Kannur district in the Indian state of Kerala.

Demographics

Literacy rate among the population is high and the area is secular in nature. Eventhough some politicians tried to manipulate the communal harmony by deviding right wing people against others , people remain responsible towards fellow humans.( RSS and right wing extremists)faiths followed include; Christianity, Hinduism and Islam. Majority of the population migrated from the southern part of Kerala. There is a small  population of indigenous people living in karthikapuram who are the original people of the land.

Economy
Most economic activity revolves around small farms and small businesses. Natural Rubber, coconut, and spices like; ginger, black-pepper etc. are grown here. Educated and skilled residents typically migrate to bigger cities since the employment opportunities are low. Most of the youngsters are employed in out side of kerala and in foreign countries in Midle east, north america and europe.

Administration
It is coming under Udayagiri Panchayat and Thalipparambu Block.
The nearest tourist places are paithal mala and palakkayam Thattu. There are few organic farms and hill station stay available in near places.
Udayagiri grama panchayat has shown a keen interest in protecting its greener environment and echo system all through these years and their efforts are commendable

Government offices
Grama panchayath office, KSEB office , post office and GHSS Karthikapuram school

Health care
The nearest government hospital available is the government hospital near to Karthikapuram town. The hospital has facility to hold patients over nights and doctor services during the day. 
A homeopathy clinic is available in town and  doctor consultation is only limited to business hours.

Religious centers 
Karthikapuram has a roman catholic church and a Hindu temple near to the town.

Transportation
The national highway passes through Taliparamba town. Goa and Mumbai can be accessed on the northern side and Cochin and Thiruvananthapuram can be accessed on the southern side.  Taliparamba has a good bus station and buses are easily available to all parts of Kannur district.  The road to the east of Iritty connects to Mysore and Bangalore. But buses to these cities are available only from Kannur, 22 km to the south. The kannur airport is the closest airport.The nearest railway stations are Kannapuram  and Kannur on Mangalore-Palakkad line. 
Trains are available to almost all parts of India subject to advance booking over the internet. There are airports at Kannur, Mangalore and Calicut. All of them are small international airports with direct flights available only to Middle Eastern countries.

See also
 Udayagiri
 Paithalmala
 Kappimala
 Alakode
 Palakayam Thattu (Kannur)

References
https://www.youtube.com/watch?v=C-m_dz17fe4
Villages near Taliparamba